Cyperus paniceus is a species of sedge that is native to parts of Asia.

See also 
 List of Cyperus species

References 

paniceus
Plants described in 1870
Flora of India
Flora of Nepal
Flora of Indonesia
Flora of Bangladesh
Flora of Cambodia
Flora of Sri Lanka
Flora of Thailand
Flora of Vietnam
Flora of Seychelles
Taxa named by Johann Otto Boeckeler